Yuri Kisil (born September 18, 1995) is a Canadian competitive swimmer who is a freestyle sprinter. A three-time medalist at the World Aquatics Championships, Kisil has represented Canada at the 2016 and 2020 Summer Olympics.

Career

2013–2016
Kisil's selection to the World Junior Championships in Dubai was his first major junior international competition. At this event he became the Canadian 15–17 age group national record holder in the 50 m Freestyle. Kisil was the youngest swimmer in Canadian history to win both the 50 m and 100 m freestyle national championships at the Canadian Swimming Trials in Victoria, British Columbia, on April 3, 2014. He was also the youngest Canadian to ever swim under 50 seconds in the 100m freestyle at the same event. As a result, Kisil was named to Canada's 2014 Commonwealth Games team, where he placed fourth in the 100m Freestyle.

At the 2015 Pan American Games in Toronto, Kisil won three relay medals. He was named to compete at the 2015 World Aquatics Championships in Kazan, Russia, where he won a bronze medal in the inaugural  mixed freestyle relay.

In 2016, Kisil was named to Canada's Olympic team for the 2016 Summer Olympics. He was part of the relay team that finished seventh in the  freestyle final, and individually got to the 100 m freestyle semifinals, finishing tenth.

2016–2021
In April 2017, Kisil was named to Canada's team for the 2017 World Aquatics Championships in Budapest, Hungary. He finished tenth in the semi-finals of the 100 m freestyle, and won two bronze medals as part of Canada's relay teams in the  mixed freestyle and  mixed medley.

In September 2017, he was named to Canada's team for the 2018 Commonwealth Games. Kisil made the finals of both the 50 m and 100 m freestyle, finishing fifth and seventh. At the 2018 Pan Pacific Championships in Tokyo, Kisil captured bronze in the 50 m freestyle, his first major individual international medal. He said afterward "I've wanted to get on the podium individually for a long time. To finally do it here means the world.". Following this, he departed longtime coach Tom Johnson to train in Toronto with Ben Titley, after being disappointed with the times he had been recording in the 100 m.

2019 saw the launch of the International Swimming League, a professional competition circuit for swimmers. Kisil signed with the London Roar in the inaugural season. London Roar was one of the four team to reach the ISL's season finale in Las Vegas, where they finished in second place. In spring 2020, Kisil signed with the Toronto Titans, the first Canada-based team in the ISL. Competing at the 2019 World Aquatics Championships in Gwangju, he came seventeenth in the heats of the 100 m, just missing the semi-finals.

The onset of the COVID-19 pandemic resulted in the 2020 Summer Olympics being delayed by a year. In June 2021, Kisil was named to Canada's 2020 Olympic team. He was part of Canada's team in the  freestyle relay, who unexpectedly finished in fourth place despite not even being initially favoured to make the event final.

References

External links
 
 
 
 
 
 
 

1995 births
Living people
Canadian male freestyle swimmers
Swimmers from Calgary
Swimmers at the 2014 Commonwealth Games
Swimmers at the 2015 Pan American Games
World Aquatics Championships medalists in swimming
Medalists at the FINA World Swimming Championships (25 m)
Pan American Games silver medalists for Canada
Pan American Games bronze medalists for Canada
Olympic swimmers of Canada
Swimmers at the 2016 Summer Olympics
Pan American Games medalists in swimming
University of British Columbia alumni
Swimmers at the 2018 Commonwealth Games
Medalists at the 2015 Pan American Games
Commonwealth Games competitors for Canada
Swimmers at the 2020 Summer Olympics